The M-36 or 82-BM-36 (батальонный миномёт) is a Soviet 82 millimeter calibre mortar.  The design of the M-36 is closely based on the earlier French Brandt mle 27/31 mortar with Russian modifications.  The main difference between the 82-BM-36 and the later 82-BM-37 was the adoption of a round base-plate, revised traverse/elevation controls, simplified sights and spring-loaded shock absorbers on the bi-pod to reduce the amount of relaying needed between shots. The German designation for captured M-36 mortars was 8.2 cm GrW 274/1(r).  The M-36 could fire German 81 mm ammunition but range and accuracy suffered.

Notes 

World War II infantry mortars of the Soviet Union
82 mm mortars
Military equipment introduced in the 1930s